New Castle is an unincorporated community in Belmont County, in the U.S. state of Ohio.

History
New Castle was laid out in 1834. An old variant name was Pilcher. A post office called Pilcher was established in 1840, and remained in operation until 1907.

References

Unincorporated communities in Belmont County, Ohio
Unincorporated communities in Ohio